Boussingault is a large lunar impact crater that lies near the rugged southeast limb of the Moon. Because of its location, Boussingault appears highly oblong in shape due to foreshortening. To the southwest is the crater Boguslawsky, and almost attached to the northeast rim is Helmholtz. East-southeast of Boussingault lies the crater Neumayer.

The most notable aspect of this crater is the large crater that lies entirely within its outer walls, so that it resembles a double-walled formation. The outer rim is worn and Boussingault K lies across the northwest rim. To the northwest is the overlapping triple crater formation of Boussingault E, B, and C.

Satellite craters 

By convention these features are identified on lunar maps by placing the letter on the side of the crater midpoint that is closest to Boussingault.

References 

 
 
 
 
 
 
 
 
 
 
 
 

 

Impact craters on the Moon